Zibert may refer to:

Žibert, Slovenian surname
Russian-language transliteration of the German surname Siebert
Paul Zibert, a fictional spy in  a 1967 Soviet spy film Strong with Spirit partly based on real story of soviet spy with false name Paul Zibert.